Leopard was a 34-gun third-rate ship of the line of the English Navy, built by Peter Pett I at Woolwich and launched in 1635.

During the First Anglo-Dutch War, Leopard was captured by the Eendracht of the Dutch Republic at the Battle of Leghorn on 3 March 1653, with the loss of 70 men killed and 54 wounded. In Dutch service she was renamed Luipaard.

Notes

References

Lavery, Brian (2003) The Ship of the Line - Volume 1: The development of the battlefleet 1650-1850. Conway Maritime Press. .
Winfield, Rif (2009) British Warships in the Age of Sail: 1603 - 1714. Seaforth Publishing. .

Ships of the English navy
Ships of the line of the Dutch Republic
Ships built in Woolwich
1630s ships
Captured ships